M. Gary Neuman is a rabbi, licensed family counselor, Florida Supreme Court-certified family mediator and founder of the Sandcastles Program Inc., a nationwide divorce therapy program for children.

Author
Neuman is the author of three books:

The Truth about Cheating: Why Men Stray and What You Can Do to Prevent It (Wiley)
Emotional Infidelity: How to Affair-Proof Your Marriage (Crown)
Helping Your Kids Cope with Divorce the Sandcastles Way (Random House).

In conjunction with the publication The Truth about Cheating, Neuman appeared on The Oprah Winfrey Show on September 11, 2008 and September 18, 2008.

Education
Neuman holds a masters of science in mental health counseling from Barry University (1987) and rabbinical ordination from Talmudic University (1988).

He resides in Miami Beach, Florida.

References

External links
MGaryNeuman.com, M. Gary Neuman's Website
TruthAboutCheating.com, Official Book Website for The Truth About Cheating (Wiley, 2008)
Press Release for The Truth about Cheating: Why Men Stray and What You Can Do to Prevent It
People Magazine Article about Sandcastles Program

American Orthodox rabbis
American relationships and sexuality writers
American male non-fiction writers
Barry University alumni
Family therapists
Relationship counseling
Living people
Year of birth missing (living people)
21st-century American Jews